Melba Copland Secondary School opened in 1978 at Copland Drive, Melba, Australian Capital Territory, Australia

It is a supporter of the IB Diploma Program.

In 2007, it was decided by the ACT Government to merge Copland College and Melba High School. Since 2009 the joint school has been called Melba Copland Secondary School.

History 

Merging - In 2008 Copland College was merged with Melba High School. The public announcement was that the two campuses would be shared.  It is now known as Melba Copland Secondary School.
Copland College is known for its competitive nature against other schools within the ACT in terms of the UAI the year 12 students receive.  In 2006, Copland College was ranked the third highest ranking college in the ACT.  This has had an effect on the students that have enrolled and are currently studying at the school.

External links
 Towards 2020 Proposal MS word document
 Melba Copland Secondary School

High schools in the Australian Capital Territory
International Baccalaureate schools in Australia